Animalympics is a 1980 animated television film directed by Steven Lisberger and produced by Lisberger Studios for the NBC network. Originally commissioned as two separate specials, it spoofs the Summer and Winter Olympic Games and features the voices of Billy Crystal, Gilda Radner, Harry Shearer and Michael Fremer.

Plot 
The film is a series of vignettes presented as the broadcast of the first animal Olympic Games through the fictional ZOO television network. The Games combine summer and winter Olympic events.

The event is covered mostly by Barbara Warblers, a stork, and "anchorturtle" Henry Hummel. The 100-meter dash is covered in the style of a drag race by Jackie Fuelit.

Unlike the real Olympics, continents are represented rather than countries. The continents featured are North America, South America, Eurasia, Europe, Africa, Australia, and Asia. Eurasia represents the USSR, whereas Europe represents Western and Central Europe.

The only mention of areas other than continents are the New York City Rats soccer team, Dean Wilson being from California, a Central American marathon runner named Pepé Repanosa, an Acapulco cliff diver named "Primo Cabeza", marathon runner Terry Hornsby being from Boulder, Colorado, René Fromage being from France, and Kurt Wüfner appearing at the downhill event right before a Scandinavian is given a gold medal.

Although many of the segments stand alone, there are some recurring events and important characters. The largest such story is the coverage of the marathon, where competitors René Fromage and Kit Mambo are the favorites to win. Both are determined to win – Fromage having devoted his entire life to the marathon, Mambo determined to make a name for herself – they find themselves surprised when their minds wander to thoughts of mutual admiration and then to love, culminating in the pair holding hands for the rest of the race and crossing the finish line together. Another important story is that of Kurt Wüffner, a West German dachshund skier, and his disappearance to Dogra-la during a mountain climbing expedition shortly after the slalom event.

A minor story features an alligator named Bolt Jenkins. He was "born as a handbag" and told that he would never walk again. A song during his story reveals that he lives in the sewers. After seeing a frog named Boris Amphibiensky break the world record for the high jump, Jenkins has an epiphany, and becomes determined to break the record. Jenkins goes on to set world records in the high jump, the pole vault, and later the 100-meter dash. Jenkins sacrifices his gold medal in the hundred meter dash to an African competitor and favorite whom Jenkins considers to be his superior.

The film spoofs real-life sports personalities like Howard Cosell and Muhammad Ali.

Cast
 Gilda Radner as Barbra Warblers / Brenda Springer / Cora Lee Perrier / Tatyana Tushenko / Dorrie Turnell / The Contessa
 Billy Crystal as Rugs Turkell / Joey Gongolong / Art Antica / Bruce Kwakimoto
 Harry Shearer as Keen Hacksaw / Mayor of Animalympic Island / Burnt Woody / Mark Spritz
 Michael Fremer as Henry Hummel / René Fromage / Kit Mambo / Bolt Jenkins / Kurt Wuffner / Dean Wilson / Mele / Count Maurice Boar-Deaux / Jackie Fuelit / Bear McLane / Guy Lafluke / Bjorn Freeborg / Mamo Ululu

Production
Animalympics was commissioned by NBC in 1978, as the network intended Lisberger Studios to create it as two hour-long specials to be paired alongside coverage of both the 1980 Winter Olympics and the Summer Olympics then held in Moscow. But after the Soviet Union had invaded and gained control of Afghanistan, then United States President Jimmy Carter decided to boycott the Moscow Summer Olympics. Because of this, NBC canceled its Olympic coverage and the Animalympics Summer special.

However, from its conception, producer Donald Kushner and director Steven Lisberger intended the project as a feature-length theatrical release (complete with Dolby surround sound via 35mm film), even though The Winter Olympics special was already considered for an Academy Award for Best Animated Short Film nomination.

Among those who worked on Animalympics were art director/animator Roger Allers, animation director Bill Kroyer, and animator Brad Bird. Allers, who animated Kit Mambo, the lion star of Animalympics, went on to direct The Lion King. Kroyer later wrote and directed the Oscar-nominated short Technological Threat and the animated feature FernGully: The Last Rainforest. Brad Bird went on to work as story editor of The Simpsons, and later achieved even greater success writing and directing The Iron Giant, The Incredibles and Ratatouille. Director Lisberger went on to conceive, co-write and direct the science fiction cult classic Tron, which some of the Animalympics crew were involved in. Its soundtrack supervisor was Michael Fremer, who was involved in Animalympics as a co-writer, voice artist, dialogue/music track editor and sound mix supervisor. Fremer also went on to supervise the Oscar-nominated soundtrack to Tron as well.

Soundtrack

A&M Records in the US, and Mercury Records in Europe released an Animalympics soundtrack album, which has long been out of print. The music on this soundtrack was written and produced by Graham Gouldman, who performed the tracks himself along with other members of 10cc (Gouldman is the bassist and co-founder of the band).  The soundtrack was recorded primarily in Strawberry Studios North and South, used extensively by 10cc, as well as in Los Angeles.

Pieces of classical music play in the film. "The Hut on Hen's Legs (Baba Yaga)" from Pictures at an Exhibition by Modest Mussorgsky plays during Tatyana Tushenko's floor exercises. "March to the Scaffold" from Symphonie fantastique by Hector Berlioz plays during the couple's figure skating. The 3rd movement from Symphony No. 4 by Johannes Brahms plays during Dorie Turnell's skating performance.

Track listing 
All tracks are written by Graham Gouldman

Side 1

Side 2

Personnel
Per vinyl liner notes
 Graham Gouldman – lead and backing vocals, bass, guitar, percussion, arrangements, production
 Rick Fenn – guitar, backing vocals
 Duncan Mackay – keyboards, clavinet, backing vocals
 Paul Burgess – drums, percussion
 Stuart Tosh – backing vocals
 Mike Timony – accordion on "Love's Not For Me (Rene's Song)"
 Jimmie Haskell – orchestral arrangements
 Sid Sharp – concertmaster 
 Joel Sill – coordinator 
 Alan Barson, Chris Nagle, Larry Forkner – engineering
 Tony Spath – engineering, mix-down engineer
 Melvyn Abrahams – mastering and half speed mastering at Strawberry Mastering and Sheffield Lab Matrix

Release
Despite the 1980 NBC premiere being cancelled midway, Lisberger Studios prepared a theatrical version for overseas markets by editing together the Summer and Winter Olympic Games sections, alongside other additions and changes to increase its run-time for theatrical exhibition. Though Animalympics never found a theatrical distributor in the U.S., Telepictures did acquire US home video and pay-TV distribution rights to it shortly after the NBC cancellation. It eventually got a full US TV premiere on NBC affiliate WPTZ on July 4, 1982. Animalympics also aired in its theatrical form on HBO and Showtime nationwide in summer 1984, as well as intermittently during the early to mid-1990s on The Disney Channel.

Availability
The film was released on VHS by Warner Bros., Family Home Entertainment and UAV Corporation.

On April 3, 2018, Hen's Tooth Video put out the first-ever region 1 DVD release. In 2019, German label WinklerFilm put out a remastered DVD alongside the first-ever Blu-ray release worldwide.

See also
 Laff-A-Lympics
 Sports Cartoons
 Olympic Games
 Wide World of Sports
 Tron
 Furry fandom
 1980 in television

References

External links

 
 
 
Animalympics at Don Markstein's Toonopedia. Archived from the original on April 4, 2012.
 Animalympics on Internet Archive
 Press Kit
 

1980 films
1980 animated films
1980 children's films
1980 independent films
1980 television films
1980s American animated films
1980s sports films
American animated television films
American independent films
American animated comedy films
Animated sports films
Films about animals playing sports
Films directed by Steven Lisberger
Films about fictional Olympics-inspired events
Animated films about animals
1980s children's animated films
Films produced by Donald Kushner
1980s English-language films